Adwaita Gadanayak is an Indian sculptor.

About 
He was head of the School of Sculpture at the Kalinga Institute of Industrial Technology, Bhubaneswar. He is the director general of the National Gallery of Modern Art which is under the Ministry of Culture.

Work 
His carvings and concepts include Mahatma Gandhi's Salt March statue in Rajghat, the central memorial structure at the National Police Memorial, and the Statue of Subhas Chandra Bose at National War Memorial complex.

References

1963 births
Living people
21st-century Indian sculptors
People from Dhenkanal
Indian contemporary sculptors